The 1936–37 season was the 63rd season of competitive football by Rangers.

Overview
Rangers finished as champions of Scotland, one position higher than the previous season. However, Rangers were unable to retain the Scottish league cup.

Results
All results are written with Rangers' score first.

Scottish League Division One

Scottish Cup

Appearances

See also
 1936–37 in Scottish football
 1936–37 Scottish Cup

Scottish football championship-winning seasons
Rangers F.C. seasons
Rangers